"Heavy Fuel" is a song by British rock band Dire Straits from its 1991 album On Every Street. The song was also released as a single and reached  1 on the US Billboard Album Rock Tracks chart, making it the band's second song to do so.

Lyrical content
In "Heavy Fuel," Mark Knopfler ironically extols the virtues of such vices as cigarettes, hamburgers, Scotch, lust, money and violence. The phrase "You got to run on heavy fuel" is from the novel Money by Martin Amis, on which Knopfler based his lyric.

Track listings
"Heavy Fuel"
"Planet of New Orleans"
"Kingdom Come"

Chart performance

See also
List of Billboard Mainstream Rock number-one songs of the 1990s

References

1991 singles
1991 songs
Dire Straits songs
Music videos directed by Steve Barron
Song recordings produced by Mark Knopfler
Songs written by Mark Knopfler
Vertigo Records singles